The 1907 Tour de France was the 5th edition of Tour de France, one of cycling's Grand Tours. The Tour began in Paris on 8 July and Stage 7 occurred on 20 July with a flat stage to Nîmes. The race finished in Paris on 4 August.

Stage 1
8 July 1907 — Paris to Roubaix,

Stage 2
10 July 1907 — Roubaix to Metz,

Stage 3
12 July 1907 — Metz to Belfort,

Stage 4
14 July 1907 — Belfort to Lyon,

Stage 5
16 July 1907 — Lyon to Grenoble,

Stage 6
18 July 1907 — Grenoble to Nice,

Stage 7
20 July 1907 — Nice to Nîmes,

References

1907 Tour de France
Tour de France stages